TheWeek is a free, 48-page, all-colour, independent weekly contact newspaper published from Muscat in Oman.

History and profile
The newspaper was launched in March 2003. Theweek is audited by BPA Worldwide, which has certified its circulation as being a weekly average of 50,300, the largest in the country. Theweek is the first and so far, only publication in Oman to be audited. The results of the 2007 audit were that TheWeek  has an average readership of 178,000. The 2007 audit offers the last available circulation figures.

Free copies of Theweek, published every Wednesday, are available from outlets spread across the main urban areas in Oman, including Muscat, Sohar, Sur, Nizwa and Salalah. It covers mostly local Oman-based news.

See also
 List of newspapers in Oman

References

2003 establishments in Oman
Publications established in 2003
Weekly newspapers
Newspapers published in Oman
English-language newspapers published in Arab countries